Star Ship is a first-person space combat simulator video game programmed by Bob Whitehead and published by Atari, Inc. for its Video Computer System (later known as the Atari 2600). The game was one of the nine launch titles offered when the Atari VCS was released on September 11, 1977. Based on the Atari arcade game Starship 1, it was the first space-related game developed for the Atari VCS. The re-branded Sears TeleGames version is titled Outer Space.

Star Ship was removed from Atari's catalog in 1980.

Gameplay
The player(s) use the joystick controller to achieve one of the following objectives:
 Destroying as many spacecraft and robots as possible within a time limit, all while dodging asteroids.
 Alternating between avoiding enemy fire from spacecraft and firing at the opponent-controlled craft (human or computer).
 Avoiding asteroids and other varied space objects to cover the greatest distance possible.
 Landing the space module on a lunar landing pad. The moon can either be stationary or be computer- or human opponent-controlled.

Reception
Star Ship was reviewed in Video magazine as part of a general review of the Atari VCS where it was given a review score of 4 out of 10, and its individual games were described as "look[ing] nice but [being] hard to get a handle on".

References

External links
Star Ship at Atari Mania
Star Ship  at AtariAge

1977 video games
Atari 2600 games
Atari 2600-only games
First-person shooters
Space combat simulators
Video games developed in the United States
Single-player video games